Roxanne Chan Montealegre, better known simply as Rox Montealegre (born April 4, 1990 in Manila), is a Filipina actress and a finalist of Starstruck V.  In 2011, she played the role of Lyka in the drama My Lover, My Wife, starring Maxene Magalona, Luis Alandy, Nadine Samonte, and Marco Alcaraz.  She was a former talent of GMA Artist Center and currently serving as a TV host.

Filmography

Television

References

Living people
1990 births
StarStruck (Philippine TV series) participants
People from Makati
Actresses from Metro Manila
GMA Network personalities
ABS-CBN personalities